Drimnagh Castle Secondary School is a Christian Brothers secondary school located on the Long Mile Road in the suburb of Drimnagh, Dublin, Ireland. The school buildings are situated directly beside the old Norman castle, Drimnagh Castle, from which the school takes its name.

History
Drimnagh Castle Secondary School first opened its doors in 1954. For a short time after the school opened, classes took place in the castle itself, until the current buildings were completed at a cost of £84,000.

At the time of its opening, all students were taught by Christian Brothers. Corporal punishment, while legal, was used frequently and with some vigour. The school was not free of sexual abuse during the decades when it proliferated in Irish society. As the years passed the numbers of brothers teaching in the school gradually fell, and there are currently none. The majority of students come from Drimnagh Castle Primary School, but some come from other schools in the area as well as other schools in the surrounding suburbs. Dr Ray Walsh retired as principal in 2013. The current principal is John Devilly, a former principal of St James Secondary School.

The school celebrated its 50th anniversary in 2004. The occasion was celebrated by the addition of a new sports changing facility which was officially opened on 4 October 2004 by President Mary McAleese.

Notable former students

 Ben Carolan, actor
 Frank Clarke, judge
 Eamonn Coghlan, senator and former athlete
 Kevin Moran, footballer
 Rick O'Shea, radio personality
 Niall Quinn, footballer and businessman

References

External links
 

Secondary schools in Dublin (city)
Boys' schools in the Republic of Ireland
Congregation of Christian Brothers secondary schools in the Republic of Ireland
1954 establishments in Ireland
Educational institutions established in 1954